Normal Township may refer to:

 Normal Township, McLean County, Illinois
 Normal Township, McHenry County, North Dakota, in McHenry County, North Dakota

See also
 Norman Township (disambiguation)

Township name disambiguation pages